Wojciech Tomasz Szczęsny (born 18 April 1990) is a Polish professional footballer who plays as a goalkeeper for  club Juventus and the Poland national team.

After starting his club career at Legia Warsaw, Szczęsny signed for Arsenal in January 2006, where he made his professional debut in 2009. After a spell on loan with Brentford the following season, he later became the capital club's first choice goalkeeper, winning two FA Cups and being the joint recipient of the 2013–14 Premier League Golden Glove with Petr Čech. He subsequently went on two consecutive season-long loans to Italian club Roma in 2015, where his performances earned him a move to reigning league champions Juventus in 2017. After serving mainly as a back-up to Gianluigi Buffon in his first season, during which he won a domestic double, he inherited the starting spot from the departed Buffon the following season, winning his second Serie A title; his performances also earned him a Yashin Trophy nomination in 2019. He won a third consecutive league title the following season, also winning the Serie A Best Goalkeeper Award.

At the international level, Szczęsny has earned 70 caps for Poland since his debut in 2009, and was included in the nation's squad as it co-hosted UEFA Euro 2012, also later taking part at Euro 2016, the 2018 FIFA World Cup, Euro 2020 and the 2022 World Cup.

Early life
Szczęsny was born in Warsaw. He is the son of Maciej Szczęsny, who was also a professional goalkeeper, having played for Legia Warszawa, Widzew Łódź, Polonia Warsaw and Wisła Kraków, along with seven games for the Poland national team.

Club career

Legia Warsaw
Szczęsny trained at Agrykola Warsaw as a young player; soon, Legia Warsaw's goalkeeping coach, Krzysztof Dowhań, was so impressed with the young keeper, he allowed him to take part in a training camp with Legia's first team at the age of 15, joining them afterwards.

Arsenal
In January 2006 Szczęsny joined the Arsenal youth set-up, progressing to the reserve team during the 2008–09 season. In November 2008, he lost his balance while lifting a heavy weight and both his forearms were fractured, causing him to miss five months. Szczęsny appeared on the first team bench for the first time during the Premier League match against Stoke City on 24 May 2009, remaining unused as the team concluded their season with a 4–1 victory at the Emirates Stadium.

At the start of the 2009–10 season, Szczęsny was promoted to the senior squad and given the number 53. On 22 September 2009, he made his first team debut in the Football League Cup third round, keeping a clean sheet in a 2–0 home win against West Bromwich Albion. In December 2009, manager Arsène Wenger revealed that he and the rest of Arsenal's coaching staff had high hopes for Szczęsny, saying, "We have identified Wojciech as a future great, great goalkeeper." A month later, he added, "I really believe in him that he will one day be Arsenal's number one. He has all the qualities you want from a goalkeeper."

Brentford (loan)

On 20 November 2009, Szczęsny joined League One team Brentford on a month's loan. He saved a second-half penalty in his second match, a 1–0 loss to Wycombe Wanderers. Szczęsny completed his fifth game for Brentford on 12 December 2009, where he made a number of saves to keep out Leeds United and was given the Man of the Match award. On 22 December, Arsenal agreed to extend the loan for a second month until 17 January 2010, and then until 31 January. Finally, it was extended until 31 May.

In April 2010, Brentford manager Andy Scott said, "His performances suggest that he would not be out of place in the Championship or even the Premier League. It has reached the stage where when he lets in a goal we wonder why he hasn't saved it." One year later, after Scott was sacked as Brentford manager, Szczęsny strongly criticized the club on Twitter, and hoped that Scott would not be unemployed for long. In February 2015, Szczęsny was named as Brentford's "Keeper of the Decade" in a club poll.

2010–11
On 27 October 2010, Szczęsny made his second appearance for Arsenal in the League Cup, keeping a clean sheet against Newcastle United at St James' Park and stopping numerous attempts from Newcastle players. He signed a new long-term contract on 11 November 2010, thanking both his father and his goalkeeping coach Josh Phelan for helping him progress in his breakthrough season. Szczęsny made his Premier League debut in the 1–0 loss to Manchester United at Old Trafford on 13 December 2010, deputising for Łukasz Fabiański and Manuel Almunia, who both missed the match through injury. On 8 January 2011, he started the FA Cup third-round match against Leeds United. The following weekend, Szczęsny kept his first league clean sheet in a 3–0 win over West Ham United at Upton Park.

Following Szczęsny's form after playing consecutive Premier League matches, Arsène Wenger confirmed that he would remain Arsenal's first choice goalkeeper, stating, "he's done nothing for me to take him out." On 16 February, Szczęsny made his UEFA Champions League debut against Barcelona at the Emirates Stadium, making saves in a 2–1 victory. On 27 February, Szczęsny let in a last-minute Birmingham City winner in the League Cup Final; a header from Nikola Žigić caused confusion between Szczęsny and defender Laurent Koscielny where the latter pulled out of a clearance at the last minute causing the former to lose control of the ball, which rolled right into the path of Birmingham forward Obafemi Martins, who converted from close range.

2011–12
In July 2011, Szczęsny expressed his desire to continue as Arsenal's first choice goalkeeper for the rest of his career. He played a half in each of Arsenal's pre-season games on their tour of Malaysia and China. Szczęsny was assigned the number 13 jersey, formerly worn by Alexander Hleb and Jens Lehmann. During the 2011–12 season, he became Arsenal's first-choice goalkeeper, playing every minute of the team's Premier League matches. On 24 August, Szczęsny made a vital penalty save in the 59th minute of play against Antonio Di Natale in the second leg of the Champions League qualifying round. Arsenal were tied 1–1 (2–1 on aggregate) against Udinese and Szczęsny's penalty save proved vital in securing Arsenal a spot in the lucrative group stage of the competition for the 14th-straight season. Arsenal went on to win the game 2–1 (3–1 on aggregate) with goals coming from Robin van Persie and Theo Walcott. On 28 August, he played in the 8–2 defeat to Manchester United at Old Trafford which turned out to be Arsenal's heaviest ever defeat in the Premier League and the first time they conceded eight goals for over 115 years. On 26 February 2012, Szczęsny finished on the winning side in a North London derby for the first time, as Arsenal came from 2–0 down to win 5–2 at home to Tottenham Hotspur. On 3 March 2012, Szczęsny made a number of important saves and blocked an early penalty to help Arsenal win against Liverpool at Anfield.

2012–13
Following the release of Manuel Almunia, Szczęsny was given the vacated number 1 shirt. After a couple of months out with injury, Szczęsny made his return in the 5–2 win against Tottenham.

On 13 March 2013, Szczęsny was dropped from the Arsenal team to play Bayern Munich in the Champions League. In Arsenal's next Premier League match, against Swansea City, Szczęsny returned to the Arsenal squad but was named only as a substitute, with Łukasz Fabiański selected to start in goal by Arsène Wenger.

On 20 April 2013, Szczęsny returned to the team in a Premier League match at home to Everton due to a rib injury sustained by Fabiański. In his first two matches back in the Arsenal goal, he kept consecutive clean sheets against Everton and Fulham respectively.

2013–14

Szczęsny had a testing time in the opening fixture of the 2013–14 Premier League season, as Arsenal lost 3–1 to Aston Villa. During the match, he conceded a penalty after tripping Gabriel Agbonlahor. Despite the disappointment, Szczęsny responded well by keeping three clean sheets in Arsenal's following four matches. He also made two crucial saves to help preserve Arsenal's 1–0 lead away to Crystal Palace in October, as well as keeping two consecutive clean sheets in vital wins over Liverpool and Borussia Dortmund in the Champions League. In a November 2013 match against Manchester United, Szczęsny received lengthy treatment following a head-to-head injury with Phil Jones, but finished the game after Arsenal manager Arsène Wenger allowed him to continue. Wenger said he would have substituted for Szczęsny if instructed by the team doctor, but added, "No, nobody told me anything about him," when asked if medical staff had cleared the goalkeeper to play. Tottenham coach André Villas-Boas was heavily criticised the previous week for keeping concussed keeper Hugo Lloris in a match against Everton.

On 16 November 2013, Arsenal announced that Szczęsny had signed a new long-term contract with the club. His excellent form continued throughout November, a month in which he conceded just one goal and kept five clean sheets in six matches.
He also recorded his 50th clean sheet for Arsenal on 26 November, in a Champions League match against Marseille which Arsenal won 2–0.
Szczęsny conceded a penalty and was sent off in a Champions League match against Bayern Munich in February 2014 for a foul on Arjen Robben. As he left the field, he made an offensive hand gesture. David Alaba missed the penalty, but Arsenal lost the match 2–0. In the process, Szczęsny became the 100th player sent off during Arsène Wenger's reign at Arsenal.

At the end of the season, Szczęsny was jointly award the Premier League Golden Glove award alongside Petr Čech of Chelsea, with both keeping 16 clean sheets. He also ended the season by winning his first senior trophy with Arsenal, the 2013–14 FA Cup, but was only a substitute in the final itself, with Łukasz Fabiański retaining his place as first choice goalkeeper for domestic cup competitions.

2014–15
Szczęsny conceded a penalty and was sent off in a 4–1 Champions League home win against Galatasaray on 1 October 2014 for a professional foul on Burak Yılmaz.

On 1 January 2015, Szczęsny made errors leading to both goals in Arsenal's 2–0 defeat at Southampton. He was later fined £20,000 by the club for smoking in the changing room showers after the match. He was dropped to the bench for the rest of the Premier League season, with David Ospina replacing him in goal. Szczęsny was selected to start in the 2015 FA Cup Final, keeping a clean sheet in a 4–0 victory over Aston Villa at Wembley Stadium.

Roma (loan)

2015–16
On 29 July 2015, with his opportunities further limited by Arsenal's signing of Petr Čech earlier that summer, Szczęsny joined Roma on a season-long loan. He made his Serie A debut on 22 August in a 1–1 draw at Hellas Verona. Szczęsny dislocated a finger during Roma's opening Champions League match against Barcelona after clashing with Luis Suárez, an injury that kept him out for six weeks. In December, he was dropped for Morgan De Sanctis for a league game against Atalanta after again being caught smoking following a 6–1 loss to Barcelona. In total, he made 31 league appearances throughout the season, as Roma finished the 2015–16 season with a third place in the league, clinching the last available Champions League qualifying spot. In an interview with Il Tempo newspaper, Szczęsny stated that he felt that his season with Roma had been positive, and credited his experience training and playing in Italy under manager Luciano Spalletti and goalkeeper coach Nanni as being extremely beneficial to his development.

2016–17
A second season-long loan to Roma was agreed by Arsenal, ahead of the 2016–17 season. During the summer of 2016, Roma also signed Brazilian goalkeeper Alisson Becker from Internacional, meaning that Szczęsny would face competition for a starting spot in the team. In his second season in the Italian capital, Szczęsny kept the most clean sheets in Serie A (14), helping Roma to set a club seasonal record of 87 points, and earn a second-place finish in the league. In total, he made 72 appearances in Serie A over the course of his two seasons with Roma.

Juventus

2017–18
On 19 July 2017, Szczęsny was signed by Juventus for a €12.2 million initial fee (plus an additional €3.1m in conditional bonuses) on a four-year contract. Although it was reported that Szczęsny would initially serve as a back-up to Gianluigi Buffon under manager Massimiliano Allegri, the latter goalkeeper's intention to retire at the end of the 2017–18 season saw Szczęsny labelled as a potential long-term replacement for Buffon in the media. On 9 September 2017, Szczęsny made his first appearance for Juventus, achieving a clean sheet as he started in their third match of the season, a 3–0 home win over Chievo in Serie A.

Following Juventus's 1–0 away victory against fellow title contenders Napoli on 1 December, the club's first-choice goalkeeper Buffon was ruled out of Juventus's final Champions League group match against Olympiacos four days later, after picking up a calf strain in the previous match, an injury which kept him sidelined for the rest of the month; Szczęsny replaced him in goal during the 2–0 away win, which saw him make his club debut in the Champions League, and the result secured Juventus a second-place finish in their group behind Barcelona, and a place in the knockout stages of the competition. His performances throughout Buffon's absence saw him named the club's player of the month for December 2017. On 9 May, Szczęsny won his first trophy with Juventus in a 4–0 win over Milan in the 2018 Coppa Italia Final; he was an unused substitute. Four days later, on 13 May, Szczęsny won the Scudetto, after keeping a clean sheet in a 0–0 draw with his former team Roma, in Juventus' penultimate match of the season.

2018–19
Following Buffon's departure from the club after the conclusion of the 2017–18 season, Szczęsny inherited the number 1 shirt and the starting goalkeeper spot at Juventus ahead of the 2018–19 season, despite competition from newcomer Mattia Perin. On 18 September, Szczęsny saved Dani Parejo's penalty in the match won 2–0 against Valencia. He repeated himself on 11 November when Szczęsny saved his former teammate Gonzalo Higuaín's penalty allowing Juventus win 2–0 against AC Milan. On 20 April, he started in Juventus's 2–1 home victory over rivals Fiorentina, which saw his side clinch the Serie A title. His performances throughout the season earned him a Yashin Trophy nomination in 2019.

2019–20

Upon Buffon's return to Juventus in the summer of 2019, Szczęsny offered him the number 1 shirt, but Buffon turned it down, saying "I didn't come back to take something from someone or take it back. [...] I just want to do my bit for the team. It's only right that the starting goalkeeper, Szcz[ę]sny, has the number 1 jersey". Instead, Buffon chose to wear number 77, the same number he had worn during his final season at Parma before initially joining Juventus in 2001. On 7 December, Szczęsny saved Ciro Immobile's penalty in a 3–1 defeat to Lazio. On 26 July 2020, he kept a clean-sheet in a 2–0 home win over Sampdoria, which allowed Juventus to clinch the Serie A title. For his performances, he was named the Best Goalkeeper of the season by Lega Serie A.

2020–21
On 20 September, Szczęsny made his 100th appearance in all competitions for Juventus in the club's opening match of the season, a 3–0 home win over Sampdoria in Serie A. On 2 May 2021, Szczęsny saved Andrey Galabinov's penalty in a 3–0 win against Spezia. Szczęsny repeated himself on 9 May when he saved Franck Kessie's penalty in a 3–0 defeat against AC Milan.

2021–22 
On 18 October 2021, Szczęsny saved Jordan Veretout's penalty allowing Juventus win 1–0 against his former team Roma. Against the same team, Szczęsny saved Lorenzo Pellegrini's penalty allowing Juventus win 4–3.

International career

Under-21
Szczęsny played for Poland's under-21 team and started in three 2011 European Championship qualifying matches. He was also placed on stand-by for the Polish senior team by manager Leo Beenhakker for the team's World Cup qualifiers against Northern Ireland and Slovenia in early September 2009. Since none of Poland's top three goalkeepers dropped out, however, he was not called up and instead played the U-21 qualifiers against Spain and Finland. He has a total of six caps for the U-21 squad.

Senior team
In October 2009, new manager Franciszek Smuda sent Szczęsny his first call up to the full national side, for the friendly matches against Romania and Canada. He made his debut against Canada on 18 November, coming on as a half-time substitute for Tomasz Kuszczak in a 1–0 victory at the Zdzislawa Krzyszkowiaka Stadium in Bydgoszcz. He earned his second cap and his first full match on 9 February 2011, in another friendly win of the same score, against Norway at the Estádio Algarve.

Szczęsny had a strong performance against Germany on 6 September 2011, making eight critical saves in a 2–2 draw; this earned him praise from former German international goalkeeper Oliver Kahn. He was sent off in the opening game of Poland's co-hosting of UEFA Euro 2012 against Greece, for a professional foul on Dimitris Salpingidis, costing Poland a penalty which was saved by Przemysław Tytoń in a 1–1 draw. Szczęsny failed to play again for the rest of the tournament as Tytoń played the remainder as Poland finished bottom of Group A with two points.

On 12 October 2014, Szczęsny was pivotal in securing his country's historic first victory over Germany in a Euro 2016 qualifier. He played in his nation's opening game of the tournament against Northern Ireland. He kept a clean sheet in his nation's first ever win at a European Championship, but suffered an injury, which kept him out of the rest of their campaign. Poland nonetheless made it to the quarter-finals, with former Arsenal teammate Łukasz Fabiański in goal, where they were eliminated from the tournament on penalties by eventual champions Portugal.

Szczęsny was called up to the 23-man Polish squad for the 2018 FIFA World Cup in Russia. He started in his nation's first two group matches, a 2–1 defeat against Senegal and 3–0 defeat to Colombia, but did not feature in his team's final group match – a 1–0 victory over Japan; Poland failed to qualify for the knockout phase. On 14 June 2021, Szczęsny made an own goal in a 2–1 defeat against Slovakia in the UEFA Euro 2020, becoming the first goalkeeper to score an own goal in UEFA European Championship. On 25 September 2022, he became the most capped goalkeeper in the history of Polish football by participating in an away UEFA Nations League match against Wales, which Poland won 1–0 and secured its place in the League A of the tournament. It was his 66th appearance in the national team, which allowed him to surpass the record previously held by Artur Boruc.

In November 2022, Szczęsny was named in the final squad for the 2022 FIFA World Cup in Qatar. On 26 November, he saved a penalty from Al-Dawsari and another rebound shot from Al-Breik in a 2–0 win over Saudi Arabia. On 30 November, he saved his second penalty of the World Cup against Lionel Messi of Argentina, becoming only the third goalkeeper in history to save two penalties at one World Cup tournament alongside Jan Tomaszewski (1974) and Brad Friedel (2002). Despite a 2–0 loss against the latter, Poland qualified to the round of 16 ahead of Mexico on goal difference, with his double saves against Saudi Arabia proved crucial in securing Poland a place in the last sixteen.

Style of play
During his time with Arsenal, Szczęsny earned a reputation as a tall, promising, and talented goalkeeper, who possessed significant athleticism, as well as strong reflexes, agility, shot-stopping abilities, distribution, and a good mentality, but who was also inconsistent; as such, he occasionally came under criticism in the media over technical mistakes or errors in judgement, in particular on crosses, and for his lack of development during his time with the club, as well as his lack of discipline off the pitch, including an incident in which he was reportedly fined by the club after being caught smoking in the showers.

Regarding Szczęsny's error–prone performances during his time in England, former Arsenal goalkeeper David Seaman commented in 2013 that the Polish keeper needed to become stronger mentally in order to retain his place in the first team. During his time in Italy, after producing a series of mixed performances during his first season with Roma, Szczęsny established himself as one of the best goalkeepers in Serie A during his second season with the team, and subsequently also maintained a consistently high level of performance with Juventus. In 2016, Szczęsny's former Arsenal manager Wenger labelled him a "world-class" goalkeeper. Following his move to the Turin side in 2017, Szczęsny credited the manner in which the role of the goalkeeper is prepared and coached in Italy as one of the reasons for his drastic improvement, citing his Roma manager – Spalletti – and his goalkeeping coach with the club – Guido Nanni – as figures who played a key role in his development and maturation as a goalkeeper.

In a 2017 interview with The Independent, he commented that "the goalkeeping school in Italy is very different, it's very technical and pays more attention to the details", adding that "in the two-and-a-half years since I came to Italy, I've improved massively which is thanks to the coaches and the way they work. It's not about improving when you play, it's every day in training you have to work on every aspect of your game and that's something I've really enjoyed." Regarding the general approach to training in Italy, he stated: "the coaches in Italy are much more tactical". Upon his arrival at Juventus, his teammate Buffon named him as the best goalkeeper in Serie A during the previous season, while in October of that year, he described him as being "a younger and better goalkeeper" than himself.

Szczęsny's former goalkeeping coach at Roma, Nanni, praised him in 2017 for his dedication in training, and for his ability to overcome his weaknesses and develop his all–round game, noting that he initially struggled to get to ground quickly to parry the ball and deal with low shots upon his arrival at the club, but that he improved significantly in this area under his tenure; he also lauded the keeper for his intelligence, cool demeanour, and calm composure in goal, as well as his ability with the ball at this feet. In 2020, he labelled him as one of the best goalkeepers in the world, a view which was shared by Juventus's chief football officer Fabio Paratici. During his time with Juventus, Szczęsny drew praise in the media for his decisive performances; in particular he was singled out for his reflexes, fundamental goalkeeping technique, positional sense, and consistency, as well as his efficient rather than spectacular style of goalkeeping, and his ability to handle the pressure of replacing Buffon as the team's first choice goalkeeper. However, his ability to come off his line to deal with high balls or collect crosses has still been cited as an area of weakness by pundits.

Personal life
Wojciech is the son of former goalkeeper Maciej Szczęsny.

During his career in England, his surname was often shortened as "Chesney" because of the difficult spelling of his family name, which is not common among English people. His name itself also caused problems for Arsenal supporters, and was often pronounced incorrectly, although he endeared himself to the Arsenal fans through his adopted London accent and down-to-earth attitude. This trend continued even after he transferred to Juventus. He is also known by the nickname "Tek."

In 2013, he started dating Polish singer Marina Łuczenko. They got engaged on early July 2015 during Marina's birthday party, and married on 21 May 2016. On 30 June 2018, she gave birth to their son named Liam.

Career statistics

Club

International

Honours
Arsenal
FA Cup: 2013–14, 2014–15
FA Community Shield: 2014
Football League Cup runner-up: 2010–11

Juventus
Serie A: 2017–18, 2018–19, 2019–20
Coppa Italia: 2017–18, 2020–21; runner-up: 2019–20, 2021–22
Supercoppa Italiana: 2018, 2020

Individual
Premier League Golden Glove: 2013–14
Lega Serie A Goalkeeper of the Year: 2019–20

References

External links

Wojciech Szczęsny profile at Juventus F.C.
Wojciech Szczęsny profile at LegaSerieA.it

1990 births
Living people
Footballers from Warsaw
Polish footballers
Poland youth international footballers
Poland under-21 international footballers
Poland international footballers
Association football goalkeepers
Arsenal F.C. players
Brentford F.C. players
A.S. Roma players
Juventus F.C. players
English Football League players
Premier League players
Serie A players
UEFA Euro 2012 players
UEFA Euro 2016 players
2018 FIFA World Cup players
UEFA Euro 2020 players
2022 FIFA World Cup players
Polish expatriate footballers
Expatriate footballers in England
Expatriate footballers in Italy
Polish expatriate sportspeople in England
Polish expatriate sportspeople in Italy
FA Cup Final players